This article is a list of PSA men's number 1 ranked players in the Official Men's Squash World Ranking.

The PSA Ranking are the Professional Squash Association's (PSA) merit-based method for determining the world rankings in men's squash. The top-ranked player is the player who, over the previous 12 months, has garnered the most PSA ranking points. Points are awarded based on how far a player advances in tournaments and the category of those tournaments. The PSA has used a computerized system for determining the rankings since January 1975. 

An updated rankings list is released each Monday.

Number 1 ranked Professional Squash Association (PSA) players
The statistics are updated only when the PSA website revises its rankings (Monday of every week).  In August 2022, PSA changed the world rankings from monthly to weekly.

Months at number 1 (1975-2022)

Weeks at number 1 (2022-)

Months at No. 1 by country

As of August 2022

Players who were ranked World No. 1 without having won a World Championship

Note: 
 Qamar Zaman won the British Open in 1975 (considered as the World Open on that year before its inception in 1976).

See also
 Official Men's Squash World Ranking
 Professional Squash Association
 List of PSA number 1 ranked players
 Official Women's Squash World Ranking

References

External links
PSA World Rankings

Lists of squash players
Squash records and statistics